Saraswati is a river flowing through Indore, the commercial capital of the Indian state of Madhya Pradesh. .
It doesn't contain freshwater but instead has become polluted mainly due to the pollution of the Kanh river.

For the past few years efforts are being done to revive the dying river by the means of projects.

See also
 Fair river sharing
 List of rivers by discharge
 List of rivers by length
 List of rivers of India

References

Geography of Indore
Rivers of Madhya Pradesh
Rivers of India